The pericorneal plexus  refers to a network of blood vessels in the eye; specifically to branches of the anterior conjunctival arteries. These vessels are arranged around the cornea in superficial and deep layers.

References

Human eye anatomy